Richard John Hall (20 November 1872 – 14 December 1906) was an Australian rules footballer who played with Collingwood in the Victorian Football League (VFL).

Family
The son of James Hall (1846-1920), and Margaret Hall (1847-1908), née Jarman, Richard John Hall was born at Bedwellty, in Monmouthshire, in Wales on 20 November 1872, and arrived in Australia in April 1873.

Football
Having played for Collingwood in the VFA in 1895 and 1896, he was the 23rd player to play for Collingwood in its first season of the VFL competition, playing in his single game against South Melbourne, at the Lake Oval, on 29 May 1897.

He was granted a clearance from Collingwood to Albion United in the Victorian Junior Football Association in June 1897.

Death
He died at East Preston on 14 December 1906.

Notes

External links 		
 		
 
 Dick Hall's profile at Collingwood Forever

1872 births
1906 deaths
VFL/AFL players born outside Australia
Australian rules footballers from Victoria (Australia)
Collingwood Football Club players